The Old Bradford County Courthouse (constructed in 1902) is a historic courthouse in Starke, Florida. It is located at 209 West Call Street, off U.S. Route 301. On December 27, 1974, it was added to the U.S. National Register of Historic Places.

In 1976 the building became the Andrews Center campus of Santa Fe College.  It also houses the Eugene L. Matthews Bradford County Historical Museum.

References

External links
 
Andrews Center - includes information about the Eugene L. Matthews Bradford County Historical Museum 
Bradford County listings at National Register of Historic Places
Florida's Office of Cultural and Historical Programs
Bradford County listings
Jones Rosenberg Building (Santa Fe Community College)
Bradford County Courthouse at Florida's Historic Courthouses

Buildings and structures in Bradford County, Florida
County courthouses in Florida
Courthouses on the National Register of Historic Places in Florida
Clock towers in Florida
Romanesque Revival architecture in Florida
Historic American Buildings Survey in Florida
Museums in Bradford County, Florida
National Register of Historic Places in Bradford County, Florida
Government buildings completed in 1902
1902 establishments in Florida